During the 1995–96 English football season, Crystal Palace F.C. competed in the Football League First Division.

Season summary
Alan Smith was sacked within days of relegation from the Premiership, and Steve Coppell returned to the manager's seat. Relegation also resulted in an exodus of players. The likes of Chris Coleman, Eric Young, Richard Shaw, Gareth Southgate, Iain Dowie, John Salako and Chris Armstrong were all sold to other clubs and Palace's line-up in the first game of the 1995–96 Division One campaign was barely recognisable. The campaign went poorly, and Coppell's second spell was brought to an end after only seven months, with relegation looking increasingly possible. Dave Bassett then joined the club for a second spell, which proved to be far more productive than his first as the club embarked on a stunning run of form which took them to the play-offs. The Eagles beat Charlton Athletic in the semi-finals to take them to the final against Leicester City at Wembley Stadium, in which they narrowly lost to the Foxes by a long range Steve Claridge goal in the final minute of extra time.

Final league table

Results
Crystal Palace's score comes first

Legend

Football League First Division

First Division play-offs

FA Cup

League Cup

Players

First-team squad

References

Notes

Crystal Palace F.C. seasons
Crystal Palace